

See also 
List of online music databases
List of Internet radio stations

References 

File sharing
Lists of websites
Music streaming services
 
Sharing